Catalyst Code: The Strategies Behind the World's Most Dynamic Companies is a book by Market Platform Dynamics founder David S. Evans and MIT economist (and former dean of the MIT Sloan School of Management) Richard L. Schmalensee published in 2007.

Overview

Catalyst Code is the first full-length book to examine the unique strategic problems faced by economic catalysts (or multi-sided platform businesses), enterprises that add value by facilitating interactions between two or more groups of customers who need each other in some way. Some familiar examples of economic catalysts are matchmakers old and new, auction houses, securities markets, magazines, search engines, shopping centers, credit and debit cards, and software platforms. (The authors analyzed the last two of these in the books Paying with Plastic and Invisible Engines, respectively.)

Catalyst Code draws on recent advances in economic theory, begun by Jean-Charles Rochet and Jean Tirole, and extensive interviews conducted by the business strategy consulting firm Market Platform Dynamics, with which both authors are affiliated.  The book explains how economic catalysts differ from ordinary, single-sided businesses and presents a new six-part framework for devising strategies for launching and sustaining successful catalyst businesses.

Topics discussed include:

Chapter 1: What is a Catalyst? explores the profound difference between catalyst businesses and the single-sided businesses that tend to economics and business academics.
Chapter 2: Building a Catalyst Strategy explains the importance of building, stimulating, and governing a catalyst business.
Chapter 3: Identify the Catalyst Community discusses the need for determining the parameters of the possible communities to be served by a new catalyst business, and uses as examples Tufts-New England Medical Center, YouTube, MySpace.com, Diners Club and DoCoMo.
Chapter 4: Establish a Pricing Structure looks at the factors involved in creating value propositions that persuade all the necessary groups of customers to begin and continue using the platform.
Chapter 5: Design the Catalyst for Success explores solving the "chicken-and-egg" problem that is common to catalyst businesses.
Chapter 6: Focus on Profitability examines profitability issues in a multisided business.
Chapter 7: Compete Strategically with Other Catalysts looks at competition from both sides - how a catalyst entrepreneur can challenge an entrenched catalyst of today, and how a successful catalyst can defend itself against emerging challengers.
Chapter 8: Experiment and Evolve advises catalyst business entrepreneurs and executives to embrace experimentation as important in igniting a catalytic reaction and to adopt an evolutionary strategy for growth.
Chapter 9: Cracking the Catalyst Code warns that creating a successful catalyst business code is complex, especially in niches where both profit opportunities and risks are the greatest.

References
Further reading
Armstrong, Mark, "Competition in Two-Sided Markets", RAND Journal of Economics vol. 37, no. 3 (Autumn 2006): 668–691.
Eisenmann, T. G. Parker, and M. van Alstyne, “Strategies for Two-Sided Markets,” Harvard Business Review (October 2006).
Evans, David S., “The Antitrust Economics of Multi-Sided Platform Markets,” Yale Journal on Regulation vol. 20, no. 2 (2003): 325–381.
Evans, David S. and Richard Schmalensee. Paying with Plastic: The Digital Revolution in Buying and Borrowing, 2nd ed. Cambridge, MA: MIT Press, 2005.
Evans, David S., Andrei Hagiu, and Richard Schmalensee. Invisible Engines: How Software Platforms Drive Innovation and Transform Industries. Cambridge, MA: MIT Press, 2006.
Evans, David S. and Richard Schmalensee, “The Industrial Organization of Markets with Two-Sided Platforms,” Competition Policy International, vol. 3, no. 1 (2007): 151–180.
Hagiu, Andrei, “Merchant or Two-Sided Platform?” Working Paper, Harvard Business School, May 2007.
Rochet, Jean-Charles and Jean Tirole, “Platform Competition in Two-Sided Markets,” Journal of the European Economic Association vol. 1, no. 4 (2003): 990–1209.
Rochet, Jean-Charles and Jean Tirole, “Two-Sided Markets: A Progress Report,” RAND Journal of Economics vol. 37, no. 3 (Autumn 2006): 645–667.

External links
CatalystCode.com
Catalyst Code Blog
Market Platform Dynamics

Business books